This article is about the particular significance of the year 1965 to Wales and its people.

Incumbents

Secretary of State for Wales – Jim Griffiths
Archbishop of Wales – Edwin Morris, Bishop of Monmouth
Archdruid of the National Eisteddfod of Wales – Cynan

Events
May – Opening of Llandegfedd Reservoir by Newport Corporation.
17 May – Thirty-one miners are killed in a mining accident at the Cambrian Colliery, Clydach Vale, Rhondda.
24 May – The first drive-on car ferry service between Fishguard and Rosslare Harbour (Ireland) officially opens.
15 June – The Hughes-Parry Committee submits its report on the legal status of the Welsh language.
21 October – Official opening of Llyn Celyn reservoir.
17 December – A landslide on the main railway line at Bridgend kills a train driver and co-driver.
Foundation of Undeb y Cymraeg Byw ("Union of Living Welsh").

Arts and literature

Awards

National Eisteddfod of Wales (held in Newtown, Montgomeryshire)
National Eisteddfod of Wales: Chair – William David Williams
National Eisteddfod of Wales: Crown – Tom Parri Jones
National Eisteddfod of Wales: Prose Medal – Eigra Lewis Roberts

New books

English language
Peter Bryan George – Commander-1
Julian Mitchell – The White Father

Welsh language
Bedwyr Lewis Jones (ed.) – Blodeugerdd o'r Bedwaredd Ganrif ar Bymtheg
Gwilym Meredydd Jones – Dawns yr Ysgubau

Music
12 December – The Beatles' last live U.K. tour concludes with two performances at the Capitol, Cardiff.
Tom Jones releases the film theme, "What's New, Pussycat?" as a single.
Rockfield Studios (near Rockfield, Monmouthshire) becomes the world's first residential recording studio.

Film
Richard Burton stars in The Spy Who Came in from the Cold, for which he would be nominated for the Academy Award for Best Actor.
Glynis Johns stars in Mary Poppins.
Tryweryn, the Story of a Valley (film made by Friars School, Bangor).

Theatre
26 March – Harold Pinter's play The Homecoming has its world première at the New Theatre, Cardiff.

Broadcasting
February - BBC2 is received in South Wales for the first time, as a result of a new transmitter.
date unknown - Arwel Hughes becomes Head of Music at BBC Wales.

Welsh-language television
Dafydd Iwan begins appearing regularly on TWW's Y Dydd.

English-language television
As I See It, presented by Gwyn Thomas

Sport
Rugby union – Wales win the Triple Crown for the first time in 13 years.
BBC Wales Sports Personality of the Year – Clive Rowlands

Births
5 January – Vinnie Jones, footballer (in Watford, England)
22 February – Steve Speirs, born Steven Roberts, actor
2 March (in Bangor, County Down) – Lembit Öpik, politician
6 March – Allan Bateman, rugby player
1 April – Alexandra Shân "Tiggy" Legge-Bourke, royal nanny
9 April – Colin Pascoe, footballer
April – Manon Antoniazzi, née Jenkins, Chief Executive and Clerk of the Senedd
3 May – Rob Brydon, comedian and actor
8 May – Andy Dibble, footballer
11 May – Jeremy Goss, footballer
16 May – Vincent Regan, actor
25 August – David Taylor, soccer player and manager
13 September – Andrew Williams, cricketer
16 October – Floyd Havard, British super-featherweight boxing champion
30 October – Michael Tremellen, cricketer
9 November – Bryn Terfel, bass-baritone singer
date unknown – Patrick Jones, poet and author

Deaths
7 January – Sarah Edwards, actress, 83
18 January – Ernest Evans, politician, 79
29 January – T. Harri Jones, poet and academic, 43 (suicide)
4 February
Hugh Morriston Davies, thoracic surgeon, 85
Llywelyn Williams, politician, 53
5 February – Sir David Brunt, meteorologist, 78
1 April – Sir John William Bowen, trade unionist and politician, 88 
22 April – Glyn Stephens, Wales international rugby union captain, 73
3 May – Howard Spring, novelist, 76
29 May – Steve Morris, Wales international rugby player, 68
16 June – Dai Parker, Wales and British Lion rugby player, 60
17 July (in Scarborough) – Dan Lewis, footballer
18 August – Christmas Price Williams, politician, 83
24 August – Elvyn Bowen, cricketer, 58
30 August – Llew Edwards, boxer, 72
11 September – Trevor Preece, cricketer, 82
1 October – Gareth Hughes, actor, 71
9 October – Russell Taylor, Wales international rugby player, 50
16 October – Hywel Davies, radio broadcaster, television interviewer and writer, 46
22 October – William Williams, Victoria Cross recipient, 75
31 October – John Roberts, Wales international rugby player, 59
4 November – Ifor Williams, academic, 84
8 November – George Hall, politician, 83
23 November – Murray Humphreys, Chicago mobster of Welsh descent, 66
26 December – Llewelyn Alberic Emilius Price-Davies, Victoria Cross recipient, 87
29 December – Claude Warner, cricketer, 83

See also
1965 in Northern Ireland

References

 
Wales
 Wales